"U Guessed It" is the debut single by American hip hop recording artist OG Maco. The song was released on September 25, 2014 by Quality Control Music and was written by OG Maco and produced by Brandon Thomas. The song peaked at number 90 on the US Billboard Hot 100.

The song found commercial success as a meme on Vine as well as in the "You got beaned" meme.

Music video
The music video for "U Guessed It" was released on YouTube on August 28, 2014. Shot by directing duo GOLDRUSH, mostly using hand-held cameras in fast motion, the video shows OG Maco and his friends in a hotel.

Feud with Beyoncé
On Twitter, OG Maco stated that Beyoncé copied his concept in the video of "U Guessed It" to her 7/11 music video.

Controversy
On February 4, 2015, OG Maco accused South Korean rapper Keith Ape, of cultural appropriation. Claiming Keith Ape, and friends, had mocked him by using black stereotypes to sell music in their video of "It G Ma". Maco also claimed that they had stolen the basis for their track from his single "U Guessed It". As of August 13, 2015, OG Maco collects royalties from "It G Ma", and has since deleted his tweets regarding his accusations of cultural appropriation. Nonetheless, he declined an invitation to be a part of the later remix rendition of "It G Ma".

Reception
On DJBooth.net, the song received 4.5 out of 5 stars.

Commercial performance
The remix of U Guessed It peaked at number 90 on the Billboard Hot 100, marking OG Maco's first and highest single charting in the United States.

Track listing
Digital download
 "U Guessed It" – 2:26
 "U Guessed It (Extended Version)" – 3:29

Remix

After the release of "U Guessed It", OG Maco, with his label OGG and OG $AVAGE, released an official remix for "U Guessed It", featuring American rapper 2 Chainz. This remix helped "U Guessed It" to peak at number 90 on the US Billboard Hot 100 chart. The remix was included on his EP OG Maco (EP).

Charts

References

External links
Lyrics of this song at Genius

2014 songs
2014 debut singles
2 Chainz songs
Southern hip hop songs
American hip hop songs
Hardcore hip hop songs
Trap music songs
Songs written by 2 Chainz